Yangyuan County is a county in Zhangjiakou Prefecture, Hebei Province, China.

Geography
Yangyuan is bounded by Huai'an County to the north, Xuanhua County to the east, Yu County to the south, and by Datong municipality in Shanxi Province to the north and west.

Climate

History
Under the Han, Yangyuan County was part of Dai Commandery.

Administration
Yangyuan runs 5 towns (zhen, 镇) and 9 townships (xiang, 乡).  The county executive, legislature and judiciary are in Xicheng Town, together with the CPC and PSB branches.

Towns
 Xicheng
 Dongcheng
 Huashaoying
 Chuaihuatuan
 Dongjingji

Townships
 Yaojiazhuang
 Dongfangchengbu
 Jing'ergou
 Sanmafang
 Gaoqiang
 Datianwa
 Xinbu
 Majuanbu
 Futujiang

References

County-level divisions of Hebei
 
Zhangjiakou